List of footballers with 100 or more caps may refer to:

 List of men's footballers with 100 or more international caps
 List of women's footballers with 100 or more international caps